The Biennale de Paris (English: Paris Biennale) is a noted French art festival.

History
The 'Biennale de Paris' was launched by Raymond Cogniat in 1959 and set up by André Malraux as he was Minister of Culture to present an overview of young creativity worldwide and to create a place of experiences and meetings.

Presentation
The XVth Biennale de Paris (2006-2008) presents immaterial art projects that take place on an international level.

Curators, art historians, art theoricians, art critics since 1959
Catherine Millet, Alfred Pacquement, Jean-Marc Poinsot, Daniel Abadie, Lucy R. Lippard, Pontus Hulten, Gérald Gassiot-Talabot, Achille Bonito Oliva, Pierre Restany, Pierre Courcelles, Paul Ardenne, Stephen Wright, Francesco Masci, Brian Holmes, Elisabeth Lebovici.

From 1959 to 2008, the Biennale de Paris presented works of artists such as
Karen Andreassian, Horst Antes, John M. Armleder, La Bergerie, Joseph Beuys, Gary Bigot, Alighiero Boetti, Microcollection, Christian Boltanski, Thierry Boutonnier, Winston Branch, Florian Brochec, Bernard Brunon (That's Painting Productions), Kees Brusse, Bureau d'Etudes, Daniel Buren, Ian Burn, Michel Chevalier, Christo, René Daniëls, Olivier Darné, Sérgio de Camargo, Francois Deck, Bernard Delville, Chinnapan Jesudoss Anthony Doss, Marcel Duchamp, Sabine Falk, Jean-Baptiste Farkas, Dominic Gagnon, Gilbert and George, Rolf Glasmeier, Dan Graham, Johannes Heisig, Anish Kapoor, Yves Klein, Park Seo-Bo, Joseph Kosuth, Karine Lebrun, André Éric Létourneau, La Chèvre Phénomène, Saint-Thomas l'Imposteur, Gordon Matta-Clark, Ricardo Mbarkho, Mario Merz, Jan Middlebos, Nam June Paik, Rodolfo Nieto,  OSTSA, Giulio Paolini, Pablo Picasso, Sadequain Michelangelo Pistoletto, Hubert Renard, Paul Robert, Saint Thomas L'Imposteur, Nana Petzet, That's Painting Productions, Richard Serra, Les Somnatistes, Robert Smithson, Soussan Ltd, Cosey Fanni Tutti, Niele Toroni, Liliane Viala, Visualinguistic, Wolf Vostell, Lawrence Weiner, Paratene Matchitt, Yasuo Mizui, Alberto Gironella. Gage Taylor (1975 he was featured in the Paris Biennalle at the Museum of Modern Art (“Mindscapes From The New Land”)

References

External links
 Biennale de Paris, Official website
 Paris Biennale (France) | Biennial Foundation

Arts festivals in France